The 1906–07 season was the fourth competitive season in the history of Plymouth Argyle Football Club.

References
General

Specific

External links
Plymouth Argyle F.C. official website
Plymouth Argyle F.C. archive

1906-07
English football clubs 1906–07 season